Stevensville Municipal Airport  is a town-owned public-use airport located two nautical miles (3.7 km) northeast of the central business district of Stevensville, a town in Ravalli County, Montana, United States.   According to the FAA's National Plan of Integrated Airport Systems for 2009–2013, it is categorized as a general aviation facility.

Facilities and aircraft 
It has one runway designated 12/30 with an asphalt surface measuring 3,800 by 60 feet (1,158 x 18 m).

For the 12-month period ending February 18, 2009, the airport had 13,500 aircraft operations, an average of 36 per day: 90% general aviation and 10% air taxi. At that time there were 78 aircraft based at this airport: 94% single-engine, 5% multi-engine and 1% helicopter.

References

External links 
 Aerial image as of 19 August 1995 from USGS The National Map
 
 

Airports in Montana
Buildings and structures in Ravalli County, Montana
Transportation in Ravalli County, Montana